All visitors arriving in the Republic of Palau must have a valid passport (for at least 6 months) and proof of return arrangements.

Visa policy map

Visa free countries
Citizens of the following countries can enter Palau without a visa:

Visa on arrival
Nationals of any country, except Myanmar and Bangladesh, can obtain a visa on arrival.The visa is valid for a maximum stay of 30 days but can be extended twice for a fee.In order to obtain a visa on arrival visitors are required to hold a proof of sufficient funds (USD 200 per week).

Visa in advance
Prior visas are required for nationals of the following countries:

Departure tax
All visitors are subject to Departure Tax & Green Fee upon exit.

Visa-free agreements 
: Palau signed a mutual visa-waiver agreement with the European Union on 7 December 2015. This agreement allows all citizens of states that are contracting parties to the Schengen Agreement to stay without a visa for a maximum period of 90 days in any 180-day period.
: Palau signed a mutual visa-waiver agreement with the Taiwan on 25 October 2018 which entered into force on 1 December 2018. This agreement allows citizens of Taiwan to stay without a visa for a period of 90 days.
: Palau signed a mutual visa-waiver agreement with the Russia on 28 September 2018 which entered into force on 27 December 2018. This agreement allows citizens of Russia to stay without a visa for a period of 30 days.

See also

Visa requirements for Palauan citizens

References

Palau
Foreign relations of Palau